The Sterling Free Public Carnegie Library is a Carnegie library located at 132 N. Broadway in Sterling, Kansas. The library was built in 1916 through a $10,000 grant from the Carnegie Foundation and housed Sterling's library association, which formed in 1902. Architect R. W. Stookey of George P. Washburn & Co. designed the library in the Jacobethan style. The one-story red brick building features a cross gable roof. The main entrance is in a projecting gabled pavilion; its doorway has a quoined limestone surround. The frieze over the doorway and a date tablet in the entrance's gable are also made of limestone.

The library was added to the National Register of Historic Places on June 25, 1987.

References

External links

Libraries on the National Register of Historic Places in Kansas
Library buildings completed in 1917
Buildings and structures in Rice County, Kansas
National Register of Historic Places in Rice County, Kansas
Jacobean architecture in the United States